Herbert Robinson may refer to:

 Herbert C. Robinson (1874–1929), British zoologist and ornithologist
 Herbert R. Robinson (1909–1990), member of the Legislative Council of Western Australia
 Herbert Robinson (Queensland politician) (1893–1969), member of the Legislative Assembly of Queensland 
 Herbert Robinson (Western Australian politician) (1876–1919), member of the Legislative Assembly of Western Australia
Herbert Robinson García (born 1996), Mexican footballer